The 2009–10 Michigan Wolverines women's basketball team will represent the University of Michigan in the 2009–10 NCAA Division I women's basketball season. The Wolverines are a member of the Big 10 and will attempt to win the NCAA championship.

Offseason
May 11, 2009: The College Sports Information Directors of America (CoSIDA) announced its Academic All-America Hall of Fame 2009 induction class. One of the five inductees is former University of Michigan basketball player Diane Dietz. She played with the school from 1979-82. She is the Wolverines all-time leading scorer and a three-time Academic All-American.
June 19, 2009: The Athletic Department announced the hiring of Jon Sanderson as the head strength and conditioning coach for basketball. Sanderson comes to Michigan after spending the last three years (2006–09) at Clemson University as an assistant strength and conditioning coach.

Regular season

Roster

Schedule

Player stats

Postseason

NCAA basketball tournament

Awards and honors

Team players drafted into the WNBA

See also
2009–10 Big Ten women's basketball season

References

Michigan
Michigan Wolverines women's basketball seasons
Michigan
Michigan